Max Logan (20 March 1934 – 21 February 2006) was an  Australian rules footballer who played with South Melbourne in the Victorian Football League (VFL).

Notes

External links 

1934 births
2006 deaths
Australian rules footballers from Tasmania
Sydney Swans players
Glenorchy Football Club players